PS-18 Ghotki-I is a constituency of the  Provincial Assembly of Sindh.

General elections 2013

General elections 2008

See also
 PS-17 Qambar Shahdadkot-IV
 PS-19 Ghotki-II

References

External links
 Election commission Pakistan's official website
 Awazoday.com check result
 Official Website of Government of Sindh

Constituencies of Sindh